Bungo Regency is a regency (kabupaten) of Jambi Province in Sumatra, Indonesia. As at the 2010 census, the regency had a population of 303,135 and 362,363 at the 2020 census. The regency covers an area of 4,659 km2. The administrative capital is the town of Muara Bungo.

Administrative districts
Bungo Regency is subdivided into seventeen districts (kecamatan), listed below with their areas and their populations at the 2010 census and the 2020 census. The table also includes the locations of the district administrative centres, and the number of villages (rural desa and urban kelurahan) in each district.

Muara Bungo Airport
Muara Bungo Airport with a 1,350 metre runway has flight routes to Jakarta, Jambi, and Bengkulu.

References

External links 

 

Regencies of Jambi